Mount Majestic may refer to:

 Mount Majestic (Victoria), a mountain in Victoria, Australia
 Mount Majestic (Utah), a mountain in Zion National Park in southwestern Utah, United States
 Clayton Peak, a mountain in northern Utah, United States, that is also sometimes known as Mount Majestic